Hatchechubbee is an unincorporated community in Russell County, Alabama, United States. Hatchechubbee has a post office with ZIP code 36858, which opened on August 17, 1855. The community's name is derived from the Creek words hachi meaning "creek" and chaba meaning "halfway".

Demographics

Hatchechubbee appeared on the 1880 U.S. Census as having 148 residents. This was the only time it was listed on the census rolls as a separate community.

Notable person
Holland Smith, United States Marine Corps General and "father" of modern U.S. amphibious warfare

References

Unincorporated communities in Russell County, Alabama
Unincorporated communities in Alabama
Alabama placenames of Native American origin